Pedro Peña Allén (14 December 1929, – 2 October 2014), was a Spanish actor, best known for his performance as Manuel in the Spanish television series Médico de familia.

Filmography

Television

References

External links
 

1929 births
2014 deaths
Spanish male television actors
20th-century Spanish male actors
21st-century Spanish male actors
Male actors from Castile and León
Deaths from dementia in Spain
Deaths from Alzheimer's disease